KGAN (channel 2) is a television station licensed to Cedar Rapids, Iowa, United States, serving Eastern Iowa as an affiliate of CBS and Fox. It is owned by Sinclair Broadcast Group, which provides certain services to Dabl affiliate KFXA (channel 28, also licensed to Cedar Rapids) under a local marketing agreement (LMA) with Second Generation of Iowa, Ltd. Both stations share studios at Broadcast Park on Old Marion Road Northeast (along IA 100) in Cedar Rapids, while KGAN's transmitter is located in Rowley near the junction of Buchanan, Benton and Linn counties.

History

The station signed on September 30, 1953, as WMT-TV, Eastern Iowa's first television station. It aired an analog signal on VHF channel 2. General manager and part-owner William B. Quarton made some remarks which were then followed by Game 1 of the 1953 World Series between the New York Yankees and Brooklyn Dodgers. The station has always been a primary CBS affiliate, but also carried a secondary affiliation with DuMont.

It was licensed to serve the Cedar Rapids, Waterloo and Dubuque areas making it the first station to be given split-market status by the Federal Communications Commission (FCC). It was also the first station to transmit with 100,000 watts of power, the maximum power allowed for a low-band television station. Initially, the station was owned by a group consisting of American Broadcasting Stations, Quarton and several others. WMT-TV was sister to WMT radio (600 AM) which had been broadcasting in the area since 1922. The call letters stood for the now-defunct Waterloo Morning Tribune which owned WMT radio from 1928 until 1934.

WMT-AM-TV were based at what came to be known as Broadcast Park. When the facility was first built, the surrounding area was still mainly rural. This served as the primary tower for the next four years. In 1956, a taller tower in Rowley was built to transmit the signal but a windstorm on December 10 blew the tower down. This was soon rebuilt and remains in service today. In 1968, the WMT stations (including WMT-FM at 96.5, now KKSY-FM, which signed on in 1963) were sold to the Morton family of Louisville, Kentucky. The family's holdings eventually became known as Orion Broadcasting.

The WMT stations remained under Orion's ownership until 1981 when the company merged with Cosmos Broadcasting, a subsidiary of insurance and broadcasting conglomerate Liberty Corporation. However, the two companies owned more television stations than the FCC allowed at the time. As a condition of the sale, Cosmos had to sell WMT-TV and found a buyer in Guy Gannett Publishing of Portland, Maine. On October 29, 1981, the station changed its callsign to KGAN-TV (FCC rules at the time prohibited TV and radio stations in the same city, but with different owners from sharing the same call letters, hence the change; the "-TV" suffix would later be dropped on September 13, 1984). KGAN, along with most of Guy Gannett's broadcasting holdings, was purchased by the Sinclair Broadcast Group in 1999.

Later that same year, Sinclair announced the sale of KGAN and the Springfield/Champaign, Illinois duo of WICS and semi-satellite WICD to Sunrise Television. The FCC, however, did not allow the Sunrise purchase due to the company's ownership structure. A large block of Sunrise stock was owned by the investment firm Hicks, Muse, Tate & Furst, which was also majority stockholder of the LIN TV Corporation. At the time, LIN owned WAND in Decatur, a rival to WICS/WICD. The FCC ruled that HMTF held enough stock in Sunrise that an acquisition of WICS/WICD would have resulted in a duopoly between two of the four highest-rated stations in the Central Illinois market, which is forbidden under current FCC duopoly rules. WICS and WICD simulcast much of the same programming and the two outlet's ratings are combined by Nielsen Media Research and considered to be a single station for counting purposes. Since KGAN was part of the package deal and would not have been sold to Sunrise without WICS/WICD, the sale fell through and Sinclair retained ownership of all three stations.

On January 5, 2007, KGAN was pulled from Mediacom systems as part of an ongoing retransmission dispute between Mediacom and Sinclair. The move threatened to leave many Eastern Iowa cable viewers without coverage of Super Bowl XLI until the two sides reached an agreement on February 2 that restored KGAN to Mediacom systems. The retransmission agreement expired at the end of 2009 and again Eastern Iowa viewers risked losing CBS' coverage of Super Bowl XLIV. After a short-term extension to January 8, 2010, Mediacom and Sinclair reached a one-year retransmission agreement on January 7 that ran through the end of the year.

In early 2008, Sinclair announced its intent to purchase of KFXA from Second Generation of Iowa. Normally, the FCC's duopoly rules forbid common ownership of two of the four largest stations in a single media market. Sinclair, which had already acquired the non-license assets of KFXA, is expected to seek a "failing station" waiver from the FCC to acquire the license. During late summer 2008, KGAN filed a lawsuit against the city of Cedar Rapids for failing to give the station full access to e-mail messages related to the Iowa Flood of 2008. The lawsuit has yet to be decided. On February 17, 2009, its digital signal remained on UHF channel 51 when the analog to digital conversion was completed. It has frequently preempted shows from CBS including CBS Kids in favor of movies, sports, and paid programs. Today, the station preempts programming from the network in favor of special paid programs such as those from St. Jude Children's Research Hospital.

Although KGAN had been airing network programming in HD for years prior, on October 19, 2011, it updated their local master control system to a fully HD-capable system. This allowed them to air syndicated programming and local advertising in the HD format. As a part of this transition, they moved from 1080i output (which their network programming originates in) to 720p, to keep with the rest of the Sinclair Broadcast Group family's HD formatting (as most of the group's "Big Four" network affiliates are affiliated with either Fox or ABC, both of which broadcast in 720p).

KGAN/KFXA transitioned to a 16:9 SD format for their news operation on April 8, 2012. They debuted a new studio set when their newscasts began HD broadcast on July 30, 2017. On January 1, 2021, Sinclair moved Fox programming to the second subchannel of KGAN, ending over thirty years of the Fox affiliation on Channel 28, though KGAN 2.2 retains the "Fox 28" branding.

Programming
Syndicated programming on KGAN includes Entertainment Tonight, Judge Judy, Dr. Phil, and The Drew Barrymore Show, among others. Syndicated programming on KGAN-DT2 includes The Simpsons, Modern Family, The Steve Wilkos Show and Maury among others. Unlike its sister station in Des Moines, KGAN-DT2 carries Xploration Station.

News operation

The station established a local news department in early 1954 and immediately launched a weeknight newscast at 6. A local broadcast seen weeknights at 10 was added to the schedule in the Fall of that year. It would begin airing a midday show weekdays at noon in late 1956. Early on, the station's weather department was highly revered by Eastern Iowans for many decades under the direction of Conrad Johnson in the 1960s and 1970s. Shortly after his retirement, longtime meteorologist Dave Towne continued that tradition for another decade. Dave was joined briefly by Andre Bernier who was the weekday morning and noon meteorologist in 1981.

Andre left KGAN in March 1982 when he became part of the launch team for The Weather Channel. In 1984, Dave Towne brought Doppler weather radar to the station and it became the first in the area to utilize the system's images for weathercasts and severe weather coverage. He took a sabbatical from television to pursue other interests and returned briefly to KGAN on weekends but has since retired from Cedar Rapids television altogether. Tim Heller was another popular weather anchor in the early-1990s who grew up not too far away from Cedar Rapids but left for sunnier weather and a larger market in Texas. While the station's local radar is still erect, it no longer pulls data from the device.

The station's news department has won two George Foster Peabody awards. The first Peabody Award was in 1956 for its role in developing The Secret of Flight television programs. These shows, focusing on aeronautical education, were made possible with the assistance of Doctor Alexander Lippisch who was the Director of the Collins Aeronautical Research Laboratory. In 1994, KGAN won another Peabody award for the work investigative reporter Sandy Riesgraf performed in helping to expose a sewer solvent scandal. Compared with the market's other news departments, KGAN traditionally focuses on the greater Cedar Rapids area. Dubuque has coverage provided though bureaus operated by KFXA but ultimately the former captures a majority of the local news demographic in that area.

It is unknown exactly when KFXA's separate news department in Cedar Rapids was shut down with that outlet's consolidation with KGAN. On March 4, 2001, KGAN began producing a nightly prime time newscast on sister station and fellow Fox affiliate KDSM-TV in Des Moines. Known as Fox 17 News at 9, this half-hour show originated live from KGAN's studios and featured its own on-air personnel. There was regional news coverage and statewide weather forecasts provided since there were no locally based personnel in Des Moines. In 2002 for the convenience of Eastern Iowa viewers, the thirty-minute program was added to KFXA through a simulcast and renamed Fox News at 9. For the most part, the broadcast's format remained the same although Eastern Iowa reports from KGAN reporters were added.

On September 2, 2008, NBC affiliate WHO-DT (owned by Local TV) in Des Moines entered into a news share agreement with KDSM. As a result, the big three outlet began producing a Central Iowa-focused prime time newscast on that station from WHO's studios. Today, KGAN continues to produce an hour-long prime time newscast at 9 seen every night on KFXA. The station did not participate in the wider implementation of Sinclair's now-defunct, controversial News Central format for its newscasts but did air "The Point" (a one-minute conservative political commentary) that was also controversial and a requirement of all Sinclair-owned stations with local news until the series was discontinued in December 2006.

In fall 2005, despite having no weekday morning show of its own, KGAN began producing Good Day Iowa on KFXA. This was seen for two hours from 7 until 9 and competed against national morning shows on Eastern Iowa's big three affiliates. Due to inconsistent viewership and low ratings, the newscast was canceled in July 2007. Due in part to the Iowa flood of 2008 that was still ongoing at the time, KGAN finally debuted a weekday morning newscast of its own called CBS 2 This Morning. To make room for this new program, it moved The Early Show to the 7-9 a.m. time slot. On that same day, the station also added a newscast weeknights at 5 before the CBS Evening News.

On September 19, 2011, KGAN brought back a weekday morning show to KFXA, adding the Fox 28 News at Seven AM which is seen for an hour until 8.

Weather forecasts from this station can also heard on KCRR-FM 97.7, KOEL-FM 92.3, KKHQ-FM 98.5 and KCJJ-AM 1630.

Subchannels
The station's digital signal is multiplexed:

KGAN has been digital-only since February 17, 2009; however, the station later asked for a lower position due to the limitations of the channel 51 signal and no buffer being left between it and the new wireless and cellular services which will eventually fill the band formerly allocated to channels 52-69. On the morning of April 5, 2014, the station moved to digital channel 29 and continues to identify as channel 2.1 over-the-air via PSIP.

References

External links

KGAN. CBS 2 At 50. Article from the KGAN web site (http://www.kgan.com/sections/station/50/index.shtml). Date Accessed: June 5, 2011. Cedar Rapids: KGAN-TV.

CBS network affiliates
Fox network affiliates
Quest (American TV network) affiliates
Television channels and stations established in 1953
1953 establishments in Iowa
GAN
Sinclair Broadcast Group